Mounts Creek is a  long 3rd order tributary to the Youghiogheny River in Fayette County, Pennsylvania.

Variant names
According to the Geographic Names Information System, it has also been known historically as:
Mount's Creek

Course
Mounts Creek rises about 2 miles northwest of Clinton, Pennsylvania, and then flows north, west, and south in a hook to join the Youghiogheny River just downstream of Connellsville.

Watershed
Mounts Creek drains  of area, receives about 40.8 in/year of precipitation, has a wetness index of 365.50, and is about 61% forested.

References

 
Tributaries of the Ohio River
Rivers of Pennsylvania
Rivers of Fayette County, Pennsylvania
Allegheny Plateau